3 Nights is a studio album by Australian world music group, Zulya and the Children of the Underground. The album was released in 2007.

At the ARIA Music Awards of 2007, the album won the ARIA Award for Best World Music Album.

Track listing 
 "How Lovers Fail And Fall (All Bad)" - 4:45
 "The Wolf And The Moon / Büre Häm Ay"	- 4:28
 "Children's Bird Song / Детская Песня О Птице" - 4:09
 "White Wind Tango / Танго Белого Ветра" - 4:19
 "Nevalyashka" - 0:25
 "The Night Is Dark / Ночь Темна" - 4:40
 "Love Hunter" - 4:44
 "We Twelve Girls / Bez Unike Qız Idek" - 1:53
 "Hear How She Grows / Слышишь Как Растет" - 4:45
 "Forgotten Song" - 2:21
 "Princess / Принцесса" - 4:40
 "Clocks / Часы" - 4:13
 "Red Flower / Alım Cäl Tügel Siña" - 2:58
 "The Night Is Long / Tön Ozın" - 4:24

References 

2007 albums
ARIA Award-winning albums